Abdelkader El Khiati (born 1945) is a Moroccan football defender who played for Morocco in the 1970 FIFA World Cup. He also played for FAR Rabat.

References

1945 births
Living people
Moroccan footballers
Footballers from Rabat
Morocco international footballers
Association football defenders
AS FAR (football) players
Botola players
1970 FIFA World Cup players
1972 African Cup of Nations players